Donja Vrežina is a village in Serbia located in the municipality Pantelej, City of Niš, Nišava District. At the 2011 census, there were 6,758 inhabitants.

Notable people: Bane iz Vrežinu

References

Populated places in Nišava District